Pellston Public Schools is a school district located in Pellston, Michigan. It consists of Pellston Elementary School and Pellston Middle/High School. The district mascot is the hornet.

Most of the district is in Emmet County. There it includes Pellston, Carp Lake, Levering, and portions of Brutus. Townships included are all of Bliss, Center, and McKinley, and sections of Carp Lake, Maple River, Pleasantview, Readmond, and Wawatam. Portions of the district are in Cheboygan County. There it includes Burt Township and portions of Hebron Township and Munro Township.

Schools
 Pellston Elementary School
 Pellston Middle/High School

References

External links

Cheboygan County, Michigan
Education in Emmet County, Michigan
School districts in Michigan